The Philippine Basketball Association awards a championship trophy (or cup) to the winning team at the end of each conference (tournament).

To determine a champion for a conference, a double-round elimination (sometimes a classification) round is usually held. After the elimination (or classification) round, the playoffs would be held.

There had been a variety of ways the league conducted its playoffs, such as:
 Single-elimination tournament
 The twice-to-beat advantage (The higher-seeded team needs to win only once in order to advance, while the lower-seeded team needs to win twice consecutively. This is basically a modification of the best-of-three series.)
 Round-robin (or double-round robin)
 Best-of-three series
 Best-of-five series
 Best-of-seven series

There are two types of conferences: All-Filipino or import-laden. The All-Filipino conferences are tournaments where the teams are prohibited from hiring a foreigner as an additional player. An import-laden conference is a tournament where teams are allowed to hire a foreigner (the "import") as an additional player.

Starting from the PBA's first conference, most Finals series are in a best-of-five format. The 1982 PBA Reinforced Filipino Conference is the first finals series that is best-of-seven. Starting the season after that, championship series in import-laden conferences are in a best-of-seven format, while all-Filipino conferences are best-of-five. Starting in 1989, almost finals series are in a best-of-seven format, excluding special conferences like the 1998 PBA Centennial Cup, or if the PBA is forced to shorten the season, like during the 2013–14 season, where the last two conferences were made into best-of-five series to make way for the Philippine national team's participation in the 2014 FIBA Basketball World Cup and 2014 Asian Games.

The winning team is said to be the champions of the conference. After each season, there would be no playoffs in order to determine a "season champion."

However, the teams which are both boldfaced and italicized, the Crispa Redmanizers (1976 and 1983), the San Miguel Beermen (1989), the Alaska Milkmen (1996) and the San Mig Super Coffee Mixers (2013–14), hold the distinction of winning all three conferences in one season and have the distinction of winning the "Grand Slam". Winning the Grand Slam is the equivalent of the "season championship," where the team is said to be the undisputed champion in the league.

The league previously holds a "battle for third place" playoff to determine the third place team in a conference. This practice was abandoned beginning the 2010–11 season.

Champions by season

1975–2010

2010–present
Starting from the 2010 season, the third place playoff (popularly known as the "Battle for Third") was no longer held.

Champions by franchise
Championships won from conferences shaded in gray above, such as Mobiline's 1998 Centennial Cup and Añejo's 1988 PBA-IBA Championship titles are not included in the table below.

Bold denotes active franchise
* Guest team

Championships by player
The teams provided were the teams that the player were part of the championship roster.

Championships by coach
Listed below are the coaches who won at least two PBA championships. Championships won from conferences shaded in gray above, such as Eric Altamirano's 1998 Centennial Cup and Rino Salazar's 1988 PBA-IBA Championship titles are not included in the table below. Both coaches otherwise would have won two titles each if those were included, instead of just one.

See also
PBA Finals Most Valuable Player Award

Notes

References
PBA champions: 1970s
PBA champions: 1980s
PBA champions: 1990s
PBA champions: 2000-2003

Champions
PBA